Lankill Standing Stone is a standing stone and National Monument located in County Mayo, Ireland.

Location
Toberbrendan, an early monastic site, is immediately to the southwest.

History
The stone possibly dates to the Bronze Age period but was Christianised centuries later with a cross carved on it.

The purpose of standing stones is unclear; they may have served as boundary markers, ritual or ceremonial sites, burial sites or astrological alignments.

Description
On the west face is a cross with a V-shaped ornament beneath it, and on the east face is a Latin cross in a double circle and four concentric circles; this probably indicates a "pagan" monument that was later appropriated by Christians.

References

National Monuments in County Mayo